
Gmina Rutki is a rural gmina (administrative district) in Zambrów County, Podlaskie Voivodeship, in north-eastern Poland.

The gmina contains part of the protected area called Łomża Landscape Park.

Villages
Gmina Rutki contains the villages and settlements of: 
 
 Czochanie-Góra
 Dębniki
 Dobrochy
 Duchny-Wieluny
 Górskie Ponikły-Stok
 Grądy-Woniecko
 Gronostaje-Puszcza
 Jaworki
 Jawory-Klepacze
 Kałęczyn-Walochy
 Kalinówka-Basie
 Kalinówka-Bystry
 Kalinówka-Wielobory
 Kołomyja
 Kołomyjka
 Konopki Leśne
 Kossaki Nadbielne
 Kossaki-Falki
 Kossaki-Ostatki
 Mężenin
 Mieczki
 Modzele-Górki
 Nowe Zalesie
 Nowe Zambrzyce
 Olszewo-Przyborowo
 Ożarki-Olszanka
 Ożary Wielkie
 Pęsy-Lipno
 Pruszki Wielkie
 Rutki-Jatki
 Rutki-Kossaki
 Rutki-Nowiny
 Rutki-Tartak Nowy
 Śliwowo-Łopienite
 Stare Zalesie
 Stare Zambrzyce
 Świątki-Wiercice
 Szlasy-Lipno
 Szlasy-Łopienite
 Szlasy-Mieszki
 Walochy-Mońki
 Wybrany
 Zambrzyce-Jankowo
 Zambrzyce-Kapusty
 Zambrzyce-Króle
 Zambrzyce-Plewki

Neighbouring gminas
Gmina Rutki is bordered by the gminas of Kobylin-Borzymy, Kołaki Kościelne, Kulesze Kościelne, Łomża, Wizna, Zambrów and Zawady.

References

External links
Polish official population figures 2006

Rutki
Zambrów County